Cadra furcatella is a moth of the family Pyralidae described by Gottlieb August Wilhelm Herrich-Schäffer in 1849. It is found in southern Europe, southern Russia, Turkey, Morocco, Libya, Iran, Afghanistan, Uzbekistan, Turkmenistan, Azerbaijan and Georgia.

References

External links
Lepiforum.de

Moths described in 1849
Phycitini
Moths of Europe
Moths of Asia